PANU or Panu may refer to:

New Corrientes Party, a political party in Argentina (Partido Nuevo Corrientes)
Party of National Unity (Fiji), a political party in Fiji
National Alliance Party for Unity, a political party in Belgium (Parti de l’Alliance Nationale pour l’Unité)
PAN User, a Bluetooth client device connected to another Bluetooth device, a Group Ad hoc Network or a Network Access Point

Persons with surname Panu
George Panu, Romanian politician, memoirist and journalist

Persons with forename Panu
Panu Aaltio (born 1982), a Finnish film composer
Panu Kuusela (born 1979), a Finnish footballer